Wadj-wer, also spelled Uatch-ur is an Egyptian god of fertility whose name means the "great green".

It was commonly believed that Wadj-wer was a personification of the Mediterranean Sea; however, it is apparently more likely that he rather represented the lagoons and lakes in the northernmost Nile Delta, as suggested by some texts describing the "great green" as dry lands which could be crossed by foot, possibly a mention of the edge between two or more lakes.

The earliest known attestation of Wadj-wer is dated back to the 5th Dynasty, in the mortuary temple of the pyramid of Sahure, at Abusir; here he appears similar to the god Hapi, but with his body filled by water ripples. He also appears on the walls of the much later (20th Dynasty) tomb QV55 of prince Amunherkhepeshef, son of pharaoh Ramesses III.

See also 

 Hapi (Nile god)
 Nu (mythology)

References

Further reading

  

Egyptian gods
Fertility gods
Water gods
Nile Delta
Intersex in religion and mythology